The National Super League is a league for semi-professional association football clubs in Trinidad and Tobago. It is the second-highest division of the Trinidad and Tobago football league system. The league currently comprises 19 teams between 2 leagues and operates on a system of relegation between those leagues. Although the Super League champion of each season can apply for membership in the TT Pro League, the two leagues do not operate on an automatic promotion and relegation system. Seasons run from June to December, with League 1 teams playing 22 regular season matches and League 2 teams playing 12.

The league was founded in 2003 to allow the best teams from association football to play in a semi-professional environment, as they prepare for life in the professional game. The first season took place in the same year beginning with eleven teams. As of the 2012 season, there have been a total of 36 distinct teams that have taken part in the Super League, but only six have won the title: Crab Connection, Joe Public, Police, T&TEC, WASA, and the Trinidad and Tobago U20 team. WASA are the current league champions, who claimed their second title in 2012.
In 2017, the league rebranded to form the TT Super League

The winners of the National Super League may apply for promotion at the end of each season to the TT Pro League. Potential promoted clubs must be elected by Pro League members. As a consequence, there is no guarantee that winning the Super League will result in promotion. In the first ten seasons, the Super League has provided the Pro League with four teams – Superstar Rangers, Police, Joe Public, and T&TEC.

History

Competition format
The league comprises 12 teams, consisting of teams from each of the country's six regional football association leagues. Over the course of a season, which runs annually from July to February, each team plays twice against the others in the league, once at their home stadium and once at that of their opponents. This makes for a total of 22 games played each season. Clubs gain three points for a win, one for a draw, and none for a defeat. The teams are ranked in the league table by points gained, then goal difference, and then goals scored.

At the end of the season, the league champion may apply for promotion to the TT Pro League. However, potential promoted clubs must be elected by Pro League members. As a consequence, there is no guarantee that winning the Super League will result in promotion. The bottom two teams are relegated to the third tier in the league system comprising the six regional leagues and are replaced by the top two finishers in a promotion playoff contested between the six regional champions.

Cup competitions
In addition to competing in the annual Trinidad and Tobago Football Association Trophy, Super League clubs are also invited to enter the Classic (currently called the TOYOTA Classic) organised by the TT Pro League. The National Super League organises one knock-out cup competition: the Super League Cup. The League Cup was established in 2004 and is open to all Super League clubs.

Sponsorship

The National Super League has been sponsored since its inception in 2003. The sponsor has been able to determine the league's sponsorship name. The list below details who the sponsors have been and what they called the competition:

2003–2005: All Sport (All-Sport National Super League)
2006–2013: bmobile (bmobile National Super League)

Clubs
A total of 36 distinct teams have played in the National Super League since its inception in 2003, however, only six have won the league title. In addition, only WASA have been members of the league since its inception.

The following 19 clubs competed in the TT Super League during the 2017 season.

League 1

League 2

Top scorers

See also

 Trinidad and Tobago Football Association
 Association football in Trinidad and Tobago
 Trinidad and Tobago national football team

References

External links
Soca Warriors Online, National Super League

 
2
Sports leagues established in 2003
Trin